Binibining Pilipinas 2009 was the 46th edition of Binibining Pilipinas. It took place at the Smart Araneta Coliseum in Quezon City, Metro Manila, Philippines on March 7, 2009.

At the end of the event, Jennifer Barrientos crowned Bianca Manalo as Binibining Pilipinas Universe 2009, Danielle Castaño crowned Marie-Ann Umali as Binibining Pilipinas World 2009, and Patricia Fernandez crowned Melody Gersbach as Binibining Pilipinas International 2009. Richell Angalot was named 1st Runner-Up and Regina Hahn was named 2nd Runner-Up.

Results
Color keys
  The contestant was a Semi-Finalist in an International pageant.
  The contestant did not place.

Special Awards

Contestants 
24 contestants competed for the three titles.

Notes

Post-pageant Notes
 Bianca Manalo competed at Miss Universe 2009 in Nassau, Bahamas but was unplaced. Marie-Ann Umali was also unplaced when she competed at Miss World 2009 in Johannesburg.
 Melody Gersbach competed at Miss International 2009 and was one of the fifteen semifinalists. On August 21, 2010, Gersbach died due to a car-bus collision.
 Both Sandra Seifert and Vanessa Johnson competed at Miss Philippines Earth 2009. Johnson was part of the ten semifinalists, while Seifert won the Miss Philippines Earth 2009 title. Seifert then competed at Miss Earth 2009 in Boracay and was crowned Miss Air 2009. She was also awarded the Best in Swimsuit and Best in Long Gown Award.

References 

2009
2009 in the Philippines
2009 beauty pageants